Badarpur village is located at Patuakhali District in the Barisal Division of south Bangal, Bangladesh.

References

External links
 Satellite map at Maplandia.com

Populated places in Patuakhali District